Anton Tremmel (born 26 November 1994) is a German alpine ski racer.

He competed at the World Championships 2019.

World Championship results

References

External links
 
 

1994 births
Living people
German male alpine skiers
21st-century German people